The First Secretary of the Karelian regional branch of the Communist Party of the Soviet Union was the position of highest authority in the Karelian ASSR (1923–1940, 1956–1991) in the Russian SFSR, and in the Karelo-Finnish SSR (1940–1956) of the Soviet Union. The position was created in 1921, and abolished in August 1991. The First Secretary was a de facto appointed position usually by the Politburo or the General Secretary himself.

List of First Secretaries of the Karelian Communist Party

See also
Karelian Autonomous Soviet Socialist Republic
Karelo-Finnish Soviet Socialist Republic

Notes

Sources
 World Statesmen.org

Regional Committees of the Communist Party of the Soviet Union
Politics of the Republic of Karelia
1921 establishments in Russia
1991 disestablishments in the Soviet Union